Christopher John Lawrence (27 July 1933 – 13 August 2011) was a British former racing driver from England. Born in Ealing, London, he participated regularly in the Le Mans 24 Hours race and in two World Championship Formula One Grands Prix, driving a special Cooper-Ferrari, debuting on 16 July 1966. He scored no championship points.

Lawrence later founded the London-based company LawrenceTune,  constructors of the Morgan +4 Super Sports (racing version).

Lawrence was also responsible for designing the Deep Sanderson series of racing and sports cars.

In addition, Lawrence also helped design the 1972 Monica 560 luxury French saloon.

He died of cancer aged 78.

Racing record

Complete British Saloon Car Championship results
(key) (Races in bold indicate pole position; races in italics indicate fastest lap.)

Complete Formula One World Championship results
(key)

References

External links
Profile at www.grandprix.com

1933 births
2011 deaths
People from Ealing
Deaths from cancer in England
British automobile designers
English racing drivers
English Formula One drivers
24 Hours of Le Mans drivers
World Sportscar Championship drivers